The 2020 Maine Democratic presidential primary took place on March 3, 2020, as one of 15 contests scheduled on Super Tuesday in the Democratic Party primaries for the 2020 presidential election, following the South Carolina primary the weekend before. The Maine primary, the first in the state since 2000, was a closed primary, meaning that only registered Democrats could vote in this primary, but unenrolled voters were permitted to enroll in a party at the polls with same day registration. The state awarded 32 delegates towards the 2020 Democratic National Convention, 24 of which were pledged delegates allocated based on the results of the primary. The primary election coincided with a people's veto referendum to reject changes to Maine's vaccination laws.

In a result described as a "stunning upset", the Bangor Daily News and the Associated Press called the primary for former vice president Joe Biden, which heavily contrasted Bernie Sanders' win in the 2016 caucus, when he had won with over 60% of the vote against Hillary Clinton. Biden won the primary with 33.4% of the vote, heavily exceeding his polling numbers by at least 10 points, while senator Sanders finished second with a more or less expected or slightly underperformed result of 32.4%. With a margin of less than 2,000 votes and especially just around 300 votes in the 1st congressional district, Biden managed to narrowly gain one more delegate than Sanders in both districts, resulting in his win with 11 delegates over Sanders' 9 delegates. Senator Elizabeth Warren also managed to cross the threshold with 15.6% in the state around her home region but only received 4 delegates.

Procedure
Maine was one of 14 states and one territory holding primaries on March 3, 2020, also known as "Super Tuesday", as governor Janet Mills had signed a bill which returned the state's nominating contest from a caucus to a primary (last used between 1996 and 2000), matching a national trend for primaries. Although a bill expanding the use of ranked choice voting to presidential primary and general elections was passed by the legislature, governor Mills delayed implementation until after the 2020 primary.

Voting was expected to take place throughout the state from 6:00 a.m. until 8:00 p.m. in much of the state, with some precincts opening as late as 10:00 a.m. In the closed primary, candidates had to meet a threshold of 15 percent at the congressional district or statewide level in order to be considered viable. The 24 pledged delegates to the 2020 Democratic National Convention were allocated proportionally on the basis of the results of the primary. Of these, 7 and 9 were allocated to each of the state's 2 congressional districts and another 3 were allocated to party leaders and elected officials (PLEO delegates), in addition to 5 at-large delegates. The Super Tuesday primary as part of Stage I on the primary timetable received no bonus delegates, in order to disperse the primaries between more different date clusters and keep too many states from hoarding on the first shared date or on a March date in general.

Following municipal caucuses on March 8, 2020, to select delegates for the state convention, the state convention would subsequently be held on May 30, 2020, to vote on all pledged delegates for the Democratic National Convention. The delegation also included 8 unpledged PLEO delegates: 4 members of the Democratic National Committee, 2 members of Congress, of which both were representatives, the governor Janet Mills, and former Senate Majority Leader George J. Mitchell.

Candidates
The following candidates were on the ballot in Maine:

Running 

Joe Biden
Michael Bloomberg
Tulsi Gabbard
Bernie Sanders
Elizabeth Warren

Withdrawn
 
Cory Booker
Pete Buttigieg
Amy Klobuchar
Deval Patrick
Tom Steyer
Marianne Williamson
Andrew Yang

Write-in votes are not allowed in Maine and were counted as blank ballots.

Polling

Results

Results by county

See also
 2020 Maine Republican presidential primary

Notes
Additional candidates

References

External links
The Green Papers delegate allocation summary
Maine Democratic Party delegate selection plan 

Maine Democratic
Democratic primary
2020